Frog Rock may refer to:

Frog Rock (Bainbridge Island, Washington), a roadside attraction in the United States
Frog Rock (Connecticut), a roadside attraction in the United States
A feature of Weka Pass in New Zealand
Frog Woman Rock, a feature in the California Coast Ranges, US
Frog Rock (Kenting), a frog-shaped rock in Kenting National Park, Taiwan

See also
Rock frog (disambiguation)